Group G of the 2019 Africa Cup of Nations qualification tournament was one of the twelve groups to decide the teams which qualified for the 2019 Africa Cup of Nations finals tournament. The group consisted of four teams: DR Congo, Congo, Zimbabwe, and Liberia.

The teams played against each other in home-and-away round-robin format between June 2017 and March 2019.

Zimbabwe and DR Congo, the group winners and runners-up respectively, qualified for the 2019 Africa Cup of Nations.

Standings

Matches

Goalscorers

Notes

References

External links
32nd Edition Of Total Africa Cup Of Nations, CAFonline.com

Group G
2018–19 in Democratic Republic of the Congo football